"Cabbage" (Chinese:小白菜) is a Chinese folk song that originated in Hebei province, and has become popular all over Northern China.

Lyrics

References

Chinese folk songs
Year of song unknown
Songwriter unknown